The Rezh is a river in Sverdlovsk Oblast, Russia. At its confluence with the Neyva, the Nitsa (a tributary of the Tura, Ob's drainage basin) is formed.

The Rezh has its sources in the central Ural Mountains, and flows towards the northeast towards its confluence with the Neyva. The largest town by the river is Rezh.

References 

Rivers of Sverdlovsk Oblast